Kuhe Haji Ebrahim is a mountain of the Qandil Mountains, a subrange of the :Zagros Mountains. The peak is located in western Iran and eastern Iraq, in western Asia.

See also
 
 List of Ultras of West Asia

References
 

Zagros Mountains
Mountains of Iraq
International mountains of Asia
Iran–Iraq border
Landforms of West Azerbaijan Province
Mountains of Kurdistan
Three-thousanders
Mountains of Kurdistan Province
Mountains of Iran